The Hellenic Telecommunications and Post Commission (Ethniki Epitropi Tilepikoinonion kai Tachydromeion) or EETT is a Greek independent authority with administrative and financial autonomy. It acts as the National Regulatory Authority (NRA) in matters of provision of services and networks for electronic communications, related facilities and services, and postal services: Its operation is governed by articles 6 to 11 of Law 4070 (Government Gazette 82/A/2012).

EETT regulates, supervises and monitors:
 The electronic communications market, which is primarily dominated by companies/providers of fixed and/or mobile telephony, wireless communications and Internet.
 The use of the radio frequency spectrum, having, inter alia, the competency to grant, revoke or restrict the usage rights for radio frequencies and the licensing of antenna constructions as well as matters relating to the conditions for placing on the market and use of radio equipment.
 The postal market, in which postal services providers operate.

EETT also operates as competition commission, with all relevant powers and monitoring rights, for the implementation of the national and European legislation regarding competition in the above markets. In this context, EETT ensures the smooth operation of the markets, effectively addressing the risks of distorting competition and defending users’ rights.

Important milestones in the operation and development of EETT

EETT's logo

EETT's logo is a white network map on a red background symbolizing "the tree of communication". The older logos featured styled versions of the EETT lettering combined with a globe or a satellite pointing upwards. The "tree" logo was introduced in the first quarter of 2005.

See also
 The official website of EETT (in Greek and English)

Communications authorities
Government agencies of Greece
Regulation in Greece